Bernd-Helmut Kröplin (11 November 1944, in Schleswig, Germany – 1 January 2019) was a German engineer and academic.

Life 

After a trade apprenticeship as a bricklayer, Kröplin studied Civil Engineering at the Technical University of Braunschweig in 1977 and received a PhD for a thesis on the elastoplastic stability of steel bridges.

In 1979 Kröplin received a Heisenberg Scholarship of the German Research Community DFG and in 1982 he received an appointment as a professor at the University of Dortmund "Applied numerical methods". From 1988 to 2010 Kröplin was dean of the Institute for Statics and Dynamics of Aerospace Structures of the University of Stuttgart.

In 1999 he and three employees received the Körber European Science Prize. With the prize money of 1.5 million German marks they were asked to produce telecommunication platforms that were stationary at 20 km above the ground.

Prof. Kröplin died on 1 January 2019.

Non-academic work 

Kröplin was from September 1996 to March 2002 Chairman of CargoLifter AG, a high-risk high-reward technology venture which was stopped when it was clear there was no commercial viability in a reasonable timeframe. When finances became tighter, he took a more active management role in technology development.

As a researcher Kröplin became intrigued by the possibility that consciousness could have an effect on water. Kröplin sponsored a number of experiments which have been published in book form with many high quality pictures.

This received lukewarm coverage in the press.

References

1944 births
German engineers
2019 deaths
Engineers from Schleswig-Holstein
Technical University of Braunschweig alumni
Academic staff of the University of Stuttgart
Academic staff of the Technical University of Dortmund